Rayton Nduku Okwiri (born 26 March 1986) is a Kenyan boxer who has held the African Boxing Union middleweight title since June 2019. He also qualified to compete at the 2016 Summer Olympics which was held in Rio de Janeiro, Brazil.

Okwiri secured his place in the welterweight event in Rio by winning the gold medal in the 2016 African Boxing Olympic Qualification Tournament. He defeated Ghana's Mohameed Azumah in the semifinals to clinch his place as part of the Kenyan team in Rio before going on to beat Egypt's Walid Sedik Mohamed in the final.

Okwiri made his professional debut on 4 February 2017, defeating Salehe Mkalekwa at the Crowne Plaza Nairobi. He won the African Boxing Union middleweight title in his sixth pro fight on 8 June 2019, beating Hussein Itaba.

Professional boxing record

References

External links

1986 births
Living people
Kenyan male boxers
Middleweight boxers
African Boxing Union champions
Olympic boxers of Kenya
Boxers at the 2016 Summer Olympics
African Games bronze medalists for Kenya
African Games medalists in boxing
Competitors at the 2011 All-Africa Games